The 2019 Tour of Chongming Island was the thirteenth staging of the Tour of Chongming Island, a women's stage race held in Shanghai, China. It ran from 9 to 11 May 2019, as the 10th event of the 2019 UCI Women's World Tour. The race included 3 stages, covering a total of 347.7km.  

All three stages ended in bunch sprints and were won by Lorena Wiebes, resulting in her winning the overall classification, points classification and young rider classification.

Teams
Eighteen teams will participate in the race. Each team had a maximum of six riders:

Stages overview

Stages

Stage 1

Stage 2

Stage 3

Classification leadership table

UCI World Tour

Attributed points

References

2019 UCI Women's World Tour
2019 in Chinese sport
2019
Tour of Chongming Island